Urban gardening may refer to:
 Urban Garden (sculpture), Seattle, Washington, U.S.

The practice of growing vegetables, fruit and plants in urban areas, such as schools, backyards or apartment balconies.

 Container garden - Growing plants in pots or other containers, rather than in ground
 Urban horticulture - Growing crops or ornamental plants in urban or semi-urban setting 
 Urban agriculture - Food production in urban setting
 Windowbox
 Urban park